Jason Harris (born 24 November 1976) is an English footballer who played in the English Football League for a number of clubs before dropping into non-League football.

References

External links

English footballers
Crystal Palace F.C. players
Dover Athletic F.C. players
Bristol Rovers F.C. players
Lincoln City F.C. players
Leyton Orient F.C. players
Preston North End F.C. players
Hull City A.F.C. players
Shrewsbury Town F.C. players
Southend United F.C. players
Harrogate Town A.F.C. players
Nuneaton Borough F.C. players
Goole A.F.C. players
Bridlington Town A.F.C. players
Ossett Town F.C. players
Selby Town F.C. players
English Football League players
National League (English football) players
1976 births
Living people
Association football forwards